Tsai Sen-tien (born 28 October 1948) is a Taiwanese politician who was the Vice Minister of Health and Welfare from June 2016 until August 2017.

Early life
Tsai did his bachelor's degree in medicine from National Taiwan University in 1982.

Medical careers
Tsai was the resident physician of the Department of Otorhinolaryngology of National Taiwan University Hospital in 1984–1988, deputy superintendent of National Cheng Kung University Hospital (NCKU Hospital) in 2003–2009, superintendent of Tainan Hospital and chairperson of Department of Radiation Oncology of NCKU Hospital in 2014–2016.

Education careers
Tsai was the fellow of Department of Oncology of Johns Hopkins School of Medicine in the United States in 1990–1991, associate professor and professor of College of Medicine of National Cheng Kung University (NCKU) in 1995-1999 and since 1999 respectively and chairperson of Department of Otorhinolaryngology of NCKU in 1998–2003.

References

1948 births
Living people
Government ministers of Taiwan
Taiwanese hospital administrators
Academic staff of the National Cheng Kung University
National Taiwan University alumni
Otolaryngologists
Taiwanese surgeons
21st-century Taiwanese politicians
Johns Hopkins University fellows